Dalek I Love You was a radio drama broadcast on the British digital radio station BBC 7.  The half-hour-long play premiered on 11 February 2006. It was written by Colin Sharpe and directed by Carrie Rooney.

The play follows Nigel English (David Raynor), a Doctor Who-obsessed young man who meets a strange woman named Isabella (Fiona Clarke) at a science fiction convention, and brings her home to meet his mother (Charlie Hardwick).

The title is taken from the 1970s synthpop group Dalek I Love You, which itself is named in part after Doctor Who's Daleks.

On 22 March 2008, a sequel, Dalek, I Love You Too was broadcast on BBC 7.

CD release

The story was released on audio CD on 4 September 2006, as part of a compilation of Doctor Who-inspired audio dramas entitled Doctor Who at the BBC: The Plays.

References

External links 

 News of the premiere on the official Doctor Who site
 

BBC Radio 4 Extra programmes
Doctor Who spin-offs
2006 radio dramas
British science fiction radio programmes
British radio dramas
Doctor Who fandom